The 1974 Hammersmith Council election took place on 2 May 1974 to elect members of Hammersmith London Borough Council in London, England. The whole council was up for election and the Labour party stayed in overall control of the council.

Background
Both Labour and the Conservatives fielded a full slate of 60 candidate, as usual.

The Liberal Party ran 19 candidates across seven wards - an increase on the seven candidates across three wards which they ran in 1971.

In an era when candidates could choose their party designation without reference to an officially registered entity - two candidates in the Avonmore ward ran under the 'Powellite Conservative' banner.  These were the only candidates across the whole of the London local elections to use this designation.

Whilst 125 people across London stood as Communist Party candidates - there was just one in Hammersmith. Mr J Gould stood again in the White City ward.

Across London 72 people stood under the 'Save London Action Group' banner - but in Hammersmith there was a single such candidate, in the Crabtree ward.

Two independent candidates stood for election - one each in Crabtree ward and St Stephen's ward.

A total of 145 candidates put themselves forward for the 60 seats.

Election result
The Labour Party won 48 seats - a loss of 10 seats from the previous election, but remained firmly in control.
The Conservative Party won 10 seats - a gain of 8 seats from their previous result.
The Liberal Party won 2 seats - a gain of two from the last election, and the first time that any party other than Labour and the Conservatives won a seat on this council.  One of the newly elected Liberal councillors (Simon Knott) previously stood as a candidate at all three elections for the same ward.

Ward results

Addison

Avonmore

Broadway

Brook Green

Colehill

College Park & Old Oak

Coningham

Crabtree

Gibbs Green

Grove

Halford

Margravine

Parsons Green

St Stephen's

Sandford

Sherbrooke

Starch Green

Sulivan

Town

White City

Wormholt

References

1974
Hammersmith election
20th century in the London Borough of Hammersmith and Fulham